The 2002–03 Creighton Bluejays men's basketball team represented Creighton University during the 2002–03 NCAA Division I men's basketball season. The Bluejays, led by head coach Dana Altman, played their home games at the Omaha Civic Auditorium. They finished with a school best 29-5 record. The Creighton Bluejays finished 2nd in the Missouri Valley Conference and won the conference tournament earning a bid to the 2003 NCAA tournament.  The team featured All-American and repeat Missouri Valley Player of the Year Kyle Korver.  Korver's sharpshooting earned him national accolades including Dick Vitale's National Mid-Season Player of the Year.  Kyle Korver set the Creighton record for most three-pointers made in a game against Evansville with nine.

Roster

Schedule
 
|-
!colspan=9 style=| Regular season

|-
!colspan=9 style=| 2003 Missouri Valley Conference tournament

|-
!colspan=9 style=| 2003 NCAA tournament

|}

Rankings

2003 NBA draft

References

Creighton
Creighton
Creighton Bluejays men's basketball seasons
Blue
Blue